Carolyn Lynnet Harris (1947 – January 15, 1994) was an American library conservationist. She received a B.A. in Art History in 1969 and a Masters of Library Science in 1970, both from the University of Texas at Austin.

Career
Harris was educated at the University of Texas at Austin and began her career as a manuscript cataloguer at the University of Texas's Harry Ransom Center, where she worked from 1973 to 1980.

From 1981 to 1987, she was the head of Columbia University Libraries’ Preservation Division.  After teaching in Columbia University's preservation and conservation library science program, she was named program director in 1990.  When the program closed in 1992, she moved  it to the University of Texas at Austin.  From 1992 to 1994, she was director and a senior lecturer of the Preservation and Conservation Studies at the Graduate School of Library and Information Science at the University of Texas at Austin.

She published extensively throughout her career and was president of the Resources and Technical Services Division of the American Library Association from 1988 to 1989.  Her writings in the field of conservation and preservation won her the Jon Brubaker Award from the Catholic Library Association in 1983 and The Rex Dillow Award in 1990.

Paul Banks and Carolyn Harris Preservation Award
The Paul Banks and Carolyn Harris Preservation Award was established to honor Paul N. Banks and Carolyn Harris, early leaders in library preservation by the Association for Library Collections & Technical Services (ALCTS), a division of the American Library Association.

Death
Harris died on January 15, 1994, in Austin, Texas, at the age of 46.

Selected bibliography

Harris, C. L. (1986). “Preservation of library materials.” The ALA yearbook of library and information services, 11. Chicago: American Library Association.
Harris, C. L. (1990). “Education for preservation administration: Part 1 -- the role of the conservation education program of Columbia University's school of library service.” Conservation Administration News, (42)8-9, 24.
Harris, C. L. (1990). Education for preservation administration: Part 2—the role of the conservation education program of Columbia university's school of library service. Conservation Administration News, (43)4-5, 29.

Harris, C. L. (2000). “Selection for preservation.” Preservation. Chicago: American Library Association.

References

Graham, Peter.  “Carolyn Harris ALA Memorial Resolution.” American Library Association, February 1994.   Accessed on June 7, 2007.
“Obituaries: Carolyn Harris, 46.” Columbia University Record 19(18). February 25, 1994.  Accessed on June 7, 2007.
“Obituary: Carolyn Hixson Harris.” Abbey Newsletter 17(7). December 1993.  Accessed on June 7, 2007.

External links
 University of Texas School of Information
 ALA Association for Library Collections and Technical Services

1948 births
1994 deaths
American librarians
American women librarians
University of Texas at Austin School of Information alumni
Columbia University librarians
20th-century American women
20th-century American people